The 1997 NCAA Division I softball tournament was the sixteenth annual tournament to determine the national champion of NCAA women's collegiate softball. Held during May 1997, thirty-two Division I college softball teams contested the championship. The tournament featured eight regionals of four teams, each in a double elimination format. The 1997 Women's College World Series was held in Oklahoma City, Oklahoma from May 22 through May 26 and marked the conclusion of the 1997 NCAA Division I softball season.  The event returned to Oklahoma City after a one year hiatus, and it has remained there ever since.  Arizona won their fifth NCAA championship by defeating UCLA 10–2 in the final game.  Arizona pitcher Nancy Evans was named Women's College World Series Most Outstanding Player.

Qualifying

Regionals

Regional No. 1 - held at Tucson, Arizona

Arizona qualifies for WCWS.

Regional No. 2 - held at Columbia, South Carolina

South Carolina qualifies for WCWS.

Regional No. 3 - held at Iowa City, Iowa

Iowa qualifies for WCWS.

Regional No. 4 - held at Fresno, California

Fresno State qualifies for WCWS.

Regional No. 5 - held at Lafayette, Louisiana

UCLA qualifies for WCWS

Regional No. 6 - held at Ann Arbor, Michigan

Michigan qualifies for WCWS.

Regional No. 7 - held at Norman, Oklahoma

Washington qualifies for WCWS.

Regional No. 8 - held at Amherst, Massachusetts

UMass qualifies for WCWS.

Women's College World Series

Participants

†: Excludes results of the pre-NCAA Women's College World Series of 1969 through 1981.

Results

Bracket

Game results

Championship Game

All-Tournament Team
The following players were members of the All-Tournament Team.

References

1997 NCAA Division I softball season
NCAA Division I softball tournament